The 2015–16 Iranian Futsal Super League are the 17th season of the Iran Pro League and the 12th under the name Futsal Super League. Tasisat Daryaei Tehran are the defending champions. The season will feature 12 teams from the 2014–15 Iranian Futsal Super League and two new teams promoted from the 2014–15 Iran Futsal's 1st Division: Azarakhsh Bandar Abbas and Kashi Nilou Isfahan.

Teams

Stadia, locations and personnel 

1 Mahan Tandis Renamed to Atoliyeh Tehran. From 4th Week, Atoliyeh Tehran Renamed to Yasin Pishro.

Number of teams by region

Managerial changes

Before the start of the season

In season

League standings

Positions by round

Results table

Clubs season-progress

Awards 

 Winner: Tasisat Daryaei
 Runners-up: Mes Sungun
 Third-Place: Giti Pasand Isfahan
 Top scorer:  Ali Asghar Hassanzadeh (Tasisat Daryaei) (29)
 Best Player:  Hossein Tayyebi (Mes Sungun)
 Best Manager:  Vahid Shamsaei (Tasisat Daryaei)
 Best Goal Keeper:  Sepehr Mohammadi (Giti Pasand Isfahan)
 Best Young Player:  Moslem Oladghobad (Yasin Pishro)
 Best Goal:  Majid Hajibandeh (Misagh)
 Best Host: Ferdosi Mashhad
 Best Foreign Player:  Patrick vieira luz (Mes Sungun)
 Best Team: Tasisat Daryaei
 Fairplay Man:  Mohammad Taheri (Shahid Mansouri Gharchak)
 Fairplay Team: Azarakhsh
 Best Referee: Mahmoud Nasirlou

See also 
 2015–16 Iran Futsal's 1st Division
 2016 Iran Futsal's 2nd Division
 2015–16 Iran Pro League
 2015–16 Azadegan League
 2015–16 Iran Football's 2nd Division
 2015–16 Iran Football's 3rd Division
 2015–16 Hazfi Cup
 Iranian Super Cup

References

External links 
 Iran Futsal League on PersianLeague 
 Futsal Planet 
 Iranian Futsal News Agency 

Iranian Futsal Super League seasons
1